Ulug Orda or Uluğ Orda may refer to:
 the Crimean Khanate
 the Great Horde